Air Headquarters Air Defences Eastern Mediterranean (Air H.Q. Air Defences Eastern Mediterranean or AHQ Air Defences Eastern Mediterranean) was a sub-command of RAF Middle East Command which itself was a sub-command of the Mediterranean Air Command during World War II. Air H.Q. Air Defences Eastern Mediterranean was established on 4 March 1943, by renaming the RAF command known as AHQ Egypt. Air Vice Marshal Richard Saul was the only commander of Air HQ Air Defences Eastern Mediterranean which was renamed Air HQ Eastern Mediterranean on 1 February 1944.

Order of battle
On 10 July 1943, when the Allied forces invaded Sicily (Operation Husky), Air H.Q. Air Defences Eastern Mediterranean consisted of four fighter groups.

Air HQ Air Defences Eastern MediterraneanAir Vice Marshal Richard SaulCommanders and Squadron Assignments

Notes:
SAAF=South African Air Force; RAAF=Royal Australian Air Forces; Det.=Detachment; Met.=Meteorological.

Notes

References
 Craven, Wesley F. and James L. Cate. The Army Air Forces in World War II, Volume 2, Chicago, Illinois: Chicago University Press, 1949 (Reprinted 1983).
 Richards, D. and H. Saunders, The Royal Air Force 1939-1945 (Volume 2, HMSO, 1953).
 Army Air Forces Historical Office Headquarters, Participation of the Ninth & Twelfth Air Forces in the Sicilian Campaign, Army Air Forces Historical Study No. 37, Maxwell Air Force Base, Alabama, 1945.
Air of Authority - A history of RAF organisation.

Military units and formations of the Royal Air Force in World War II
Royal Air Force overseas commands
Military units and formations established in 1943